Freweini Mebrahtu is an Ethiopian chemical engineer and inventor who won the 2019 CNN Hero of the year award for her activism in improving girls' access to education.

Early life

Freweini was born in Ethiopia and educated in the United States, studying chemical engineering at Prairie View A&M University. In 2005, she patented a reusable menstrual pad that can be used for up to 2 years with proper care. As of 2019, she employs hundreds of locals in Tigray region of Ethiopia, and makes more than 700,000 of the reusable pads that are mainly provided to non-governmental organizations.

Contribution
Her menstrual product plus her educational campaign has helped in removing the stigma surrounding menstruation and stopped girls from dropping out of schools due to the stigma. The non profit organization Dignity Period has distributed more than 150,000 free menstrual supplies purchased from Freweni's factory. It was reported that attendance among girls improved by 24% due to this effort.

References

Living people
Ethiopian engineers
Chemical engineers
Ethiopian emigrants to the United States
Year of birth missing (living people)
Menstrual cycle
Prairie View A&M University alumni
People from Tigray Region